Luiz Carlos Azenha (Bauru, 1958) is a Brazilian blogger and journalist.

Biography 
Azenha was born in Bauru, São Paulo. He graduated in Journalism at the Escola de Comunicações e Artes — ECA of the Universidade de São Paulo. As journalist, begins his career in a local newspaper, the "Jornal da Cidade". Soon he was working at TV Bauru, a Rede Globo affiliate. In 1985, Azenha was correspondent for Rede Manchete in the United States.

In 1988, Azenha interviewed Mikhail Gorbachev in the Kremlin. In 1989, he made the coverage of the fall of the Berlin Wall for Rede Manchete.

Azenha was correspondent in the US for SBT, and, between 2001 and 2004, for Rede Globo in New York City.

From 2008 on, he works as journalist for Rede Record and has a website, www.viomundo.com.br.

Books 
 Vi o mundo (2009).

See also 
 Partido da Imprensa Golpista
 Paulo Henrique Amorim

References

External links 
 Biography of Luiz Carlos Azenha 
 Interview with Azenha 

1958 births
Living people
People from Bauru
Brazilian television journalists